A pyeong (abbreviationpy) is a Korean unit of area and floorspace, equal to a square kan or 36square Korean feet. The ping and tsubo are its equivalent Taiwanese and Japanese units, similarly based on a square bu (ja:步) or ken, equivalent to 36square Chinese or Japanese feet.

Pyeong
It is the standard traditional measure for real estate floorspace, with an average house reckoned as about 25pyeong, a studio apartment as 8–12py, and a garret as 1½py. In South Korea, the unit has been officially banned since 1961 but with little effect prior to the criminalization of its commercial use effective 1 July 2007. Informal use continues, however, including in the form of real estate use of unusual fractions of meters equivalent to unit amounts of pyeong. Real estate listings on major websites such as Daum show measurements in square meters with the pyeong equivalent.

Ping
In Taiwan, the Taiwanese ping remains in fairly common use and is about 3.306m2. In mainland China, the metrication of traditional units would produce a ping of 4m2, but it is almost unknown, with most real estate floorspace simply reckoned in square meters. The longer length of the Hong Kong  foot produces a larger ping of almost 5m2, but it is similarly uncommon.

Tsubo
In Japan, the usual measure of real estate floorspace is the tatami and the tsubo is reckoned as two tatami. The tatami varies by region but the modern standard is usually taken to be the Nagoya tatami of about 1.653m2, producing a tsubo of 3.306m2. It is sometimes reckoned as comprising 10gō.

See also
 Japanese units of measurement
 Korean units of measurement
 Taiwanese units of measurement
 Chinese units of measurement

References

Systems of units
Units of area
Korean culture